It's My Life is a 2020 Indian Hindi-language comedy drama film written and directed by Anees Bazmee and produced by Boney Kapoor and Sanjay Kapoor. The film stars Harman Baweja and Genelia D'Souza, while Nana Patekar plays a supporting role. It is a remake of the 2006 Telugu film Bommarillu, with D'Souza reprising her role. The film began production in 2007 but had a delayed release in 2020.

Plot
Abhishek "Abhi" Sharma is an energetic youngster from a rich family whose over-protective businessman father, the venerable Siddhant Kumar Sharma, wants him to take over his family business and has the final say in every decision of his son's life. Frustrated with this over-indulgence on Siddhant's part, Abhishek half-heartedly agrees to become engaged to Kajal, a rich man's daughter, but then falls for a middle-class young woman called Muskaan Mathur, unaware that he was involved in an incident with her father M. M. Mathur once when drunk. Eventually, as she confesses her love for him, Abhishek loudly proclaims his love for Muskaan too, but is caught by Siddhant; in the drama that ensues, Siddhant agrees to Abhishek's request of meeting Muskaan once, giving him an ultimatum that she must prove her worth within 7 days.

Muskaan joins the Sharma family for a vacation in Thailand on a false pretext by lying to her father for the first time; over the course of the 7-day bound, her actions irritate Abhishek to no end, as he wants her to behave in a specific way. However, at his best friend's wedding, Abhishek bumps again into M. M. Mathur, who locates his daughter. An altercation between the lovebirds eventually culminates in Muskaan announcing that she doesn't want to marry Abhishek, despite Siddhant having secretly decided in favor of it. Muskaan is confined to house arrest by M. M. Mathur upon returning to Mumbai, and the Sharma family, including Abhishek himself and his mother Lakshmi Sharma, finally confronts Siddhant about his overbearing nature. Siddhant comes to terms with his son's desire to marry a girl of his choice, and lets Abhishek and the others choose their own paths in life. Later, he meets Muskaan and brings her back to the Sharma family, while making the same deal to her father that he had made to Abhishek. The film ends with Abhishek and Muskaan getting married.

Cast
 Harman Baweja as Abhishek "Abhi" Sharma 
 Genelia D'Souza as Muskaan Mathur
 Nana Patekar as Siddhant Kumar Sharma, Abhishek's father
 Panchi Bora as Kajal, Abhishek's fiancée
 Kapil Sharma as Pyaare, Siddhant's domestic help
 Sharat Saxena as M. M. Mathur, Muskaan's father
 Inder Kumar as Jijaji, Abhishek's brother-in-law
 Shiju Kataria as Chutki Sharma, Siddhant's younger daughter
 Sonia Kapoor as Rama Sharma, Abhishek's elder sister
 Shyam Mashalkar as Shyam Chauhan, Abhishek's friend 
 Kamal Chopra as Kajal's father 
 Anuradha Patel as Lakshmi Sharma, Abhishek's mother
 Asrani as Mr. Chauhan, Shyam's father
 Amar Upadhyay as Shekhar Sharma, Abhishek's elder brother 
 Arzoo Govitrikar as Sanjana Sharma, Abhishek's sister-in-law
 Anil Kapoor as Narrator

Production
Genelia D'Souza, who portrayed the female lead role in Bommarillu (2006), was chosen to reprise her role along with Harman Baweja and Nana Patekar.

Soundtrack 
The soundtrack of It's My Life was composed by Shankar–Ehsaan–Loy in their only collaboration with Bazmee, and was released by T-Series in the week immediately preceding the film's premiere. There are six songs on the soundtrack, five of which, including the title track, are penned by Nilesh Mishra, and the sixth is penned by Shabbir Ahmed, in his only collaboration with the trio.

Release
The film was released on Zee Cinema on 29 November 2020, more than a decade after beginning production.

References

External links
 Bollywood Hungama
It's My Life on IMDB

2020s Hindi-language films
Films directed by Anees Bazmee
Hindi remakes of Telugu films
2020 films
2020 comedy-drama films